Tavenna is a comune (municipality) in the Province of Campobasso in the Italian region Molise, located about  north of Campobasso.

Tavenna borders the following municipalities: Acquaviva Collecroce, Mafalda, Montenero di Bisaccia, Palata, San Felice del Molise.

See also
 Molise Croats

References

External links
 Official website

Cities and towns in Molise